Tigger's Honey Hunt is a video game based on the Winnie the Pooh franchise that was released in 2000 for the Nintendo 64, PlayStation and Microsoft Windows. The game was developed by DokiDenki Studio for Disney Interactive, which published the Windows version and co-released the game on home consoles through NewKidCo in North America, while the European release was published by Ubi Soft. In 2002, the game was re-released in the UK as part of a two pack of Disney PlayStation games along with the game Donald Duck: Goin' Quackers. A spiritual successor titled Pooh and Tigger's Hunny Safari was later released, with different mini games but otherwise sharing much of the same story.

Plot
Winnie the Pooh decides to have a party for his friends, but needs more honey and asks Tigger to help him collect some. Other friends from the Hundred Acre Wood, including Owl, Rabbit, Eeyore, Kanga, Piglet and Roo, also help Tigger find the honey they will need. After collecting the honey only for Pooh to eat it all before the party starts, Tigger goes to ask Christopher Robin for help, and he suggests having different kinds of food. The party is a big success thanks to Pooh and Tigger.

Gameplay

Gameplay in Tigger's Honey Hunt is divided between six 2.5D platformer style levels and three mini games, for a total of nine levels. Each platforming level contains 100 honey pots to collect, and Tigger must find a required number of honey pots to complete a level. Tigger can later learn the ability to bounce higher and briefly hover in mid-air, allowing players to replay levels and reach previously inaccessible areas to find honey pots they missed. Some enemies such as bats, crows, and woozles can be defeated by jumping on them, but others like heffalumps can only be avoided.

There is one friend in each of the platform levels who needs Tigger's help finding a hidden item; helping them will unlock a Time Trial challenge for that level. Hidden in each level are photograph pieces bearing a picture of Roo, Rabbit, or Pooh, with four each for a total of 12. Roo's photograph pieces can be collected from the start, while Rabbit's and Pooh's photograph pieces will not appear until the player has collected all 100 honey pots and completed the Time Trial challenge respectively. Collecting all four of a character's photograph pieces in a level will unlock a piece of artwork in the Photo Album menu.

Apart from the platforming levels, there are three minigames that are based on classic games, and can be played with other players. "Rabbit Says" is a variation of the game Simon Says. "Pooh Stick" is a game of throwing sticks into a river, and allowing the different water currents to push them to the finishing line. "Paper, Scissors, Owl" is a version of the game Rock–paper–scissors.

The PlayStation and Windows versions feature full voice acting, along with full-motion video of scenes from The Tigger Movie and The Many Adventures of Winnie The Pooh, while the Nintendo 64 version features only limited voice acting, in addition to different music recordings.

Reception

The game received mixed reception upon release. Several reviewers complimented the game's graphics, animation, and cut scenes. 64 Magazine described the game as "the most faithful representation of any cartoon character on any games machine so far!" IGN praised the game's presentation, but criticized its dull gameplay and short length. N64 Magazine describes the lack of voiceover and animated scenes in the N64 version  as "something that looks, and plays as if it's something still half way through development". Nintendo Power pointed out that "the game relies heavily on text, and more spoken dialogue... would have been more appropriate for its audience".

See also

 List of Disney video games

References

2000 video games
Nintendo 64 games
PlayStation (console) games
Video games about cats
Video games developed in France
Windows games
Winnie-the-Pooh video games
Ubisoft games
BAFTA winners (video games)
NewKidCo games
Multiplayer and single-player video games
Video games with 2.5D graphics